William Webb,  D.D. (b Sutton Coldfield 1775 - d Litlington, Cambridgeshire 1856) was Master of Clare College from 1815 until his death.

Webbwas educated at Clare College, Cambridge. He became Fellow in 1799.  He was ordained a priest in the Church of England in 1801. He held incumbencies at Litlington, Cambridgeshire and Fornham All Saints. Webb was Vice-Chancellor of the University of Cambridge between 1817 and 1818; and between 1832 and 1833.

He died on 4 January 1856.

References

Masters of Clare College, Cambridge
Fellows of Clare College, Cambridge
Alumni of Clare College, Cambridge
1856 deaths
1775 births
People from Sutton Coldfield
19th-century English Anglican priests
Vice-Chancellors of the University of Cambridge